List of Commanders-in-Chief of the Peruvian Army since the creation of that post on March 12, 1953.

 General Manuel Morla Concha 1953-1954
 General Antonio Luna Ferreccio 1954
 General Félix Huamán Izquierdo 1957-1958
 General Víctor Tenorio Hurtado 1958
 General Alfredo Rodríguez Martínez 1958-1960
 General Alejandro Cuadra Rabines 1960
 General Nicolás Lindley López 1960-1962
 General Julio Humberto Luna Ferreccio 1962-1963
 General Rodolfo Belaúnde Ramírez 1963-1964
 General José del Carmen Cabrejo Mejía 1964-1965
 General Pablo Jhery Camino 1965
 General Julio Doig Sánchez 1965-1967
 General Juan Velasco Alvarado 1967-1968
 General Ernesto Montagne Sánchez 1968-1973
 General Edgardo Mercado Jarrín 1973-1975
 General Francisco Morales Bermúdez 1975
 General Oscar Vargas Prieto 1975-1976  
 General Jorge Fernández Maldonado 1976
 General Guillermo Arbulú Galliani 1976-1978
 General Oscar Molina Pallochia. 1978-1979
 General Pedro Richter Prada 1979-1980
 General Rafael Hoyos Rubio 1981
 General Otto Elespuru Revoredo 1981
 General Francisco Miranda Vargas 1982
 General Carlos Briceño Zevallos 1983
 General Julián Juliá Freyre 1984
 General Francisco Maury Lopez 1984
 General Germán Ruíz Figueroa 1985
 General Guillermo Monzón Arrunátegui 1986
 General Enrique López Albújar 1987
 General Artemio Palomino Toledo 1987-1989
 General Jorge Zegarra Delgado 1990-1991
 General Pedro Villanueva Valdivia 1991
 General Nicolás de Bari Hermoza Ríos 1991-1998
 General César Saucedo Sánchez 1998-1999
 General José Villanueva Ruesta 1999-2000
 General Walter Chacón Málaga 2000
 General Carlos Tafur Ganoza 2000-2001
 General José Cacho Vargas 2001
 General Víctor Bustamante Reátegui 2002
 General Roberto Chiabra León 2003
 General José Graham Ayllón 2004
 General Luis Alberto Muñoz Díaz 2005
 General César Reinoso Díaz 2006
 General Edwin Donayre 2007-2008
 General Otto Guibovich 2008-2010
Paul Da Silva Gamarra
Víctor Ripalda Ganoza
Ricardo Moncada Novoa
Ronald Emilio Hurtado Jiménez
Enrique Vergara Ciapciak
Luis Humberto Ramos Hume
César Astudillo Salcedo
Jorge Celiz Kuong
Manuel Gómez de la Torre Araníbar
Pedro Castillo
José Alberto Vizcarra Álvarez
Walter Horacio Córdova Alemán

References

Peruvian Army Official Site

Peruvian Army
Army, officers